The Crescent, at 904 N. Paterson St. in Valdosta in Lowndes County, Georgia, is a Neoclassical house built in 1898.  It was listed on the National Register of Historic Places in 1980.

It is a three-story building with a monumental two-story semi-circular portico.  It was designed by Atlanta architects Bleckley & Tyler and has also been known as the Colonel William S. West House.

References

External links

Houses on the National Register of Historic Places in Georgia (U.S. state)
Houses completed in 1900
Houses in Lowndes County, Georgia
Neoclassical architecture in Georgia (U.S. state)